Elizabethkingia is a genus of bacterium described in 2005, named after Elizabeth O. King, the discoverer of the type species. Before this genus being formed in 2005, many of the species of Elizabethkingia were classified in the Chryseobacterium genus. Elizabethkingia has been found in soil, rivers, and reservoirs worldwide.

Classification 
The genus includes four species:
 Elizabethkingia anophelis, isolated from Anopheles mosquitoes, can cause respiratory tract illness in humans, and involved in an 2016 outbreak centered in Wisconsin.
 Elizabethkingia endophytica, isolated from blemished stems of sweet corn, Zea mays
 Elizabethkingia meningoseptica, can cause outbreaks of neonatal meningitis in premature newborns and infants
 Elizabethkingia miricola, isolated from condensation water in Space Station Mir

Epidemiology 
A 2014 study revealed that Elizabethkingia is an emerging bacterial pathogen for hospital environments, with its incidence in intensive care units rising since 2004. About 5-10 cases of Elizabethkingia are reported per state in the United States every year. A recent study showed that incidence rates for Elizabethkingia increased by 432.1% for 2016–2017 over the incidence for 2009–2015. It possesses genes conferring antibiotic resistance and virulence. Combined with a lack of effective therapeutic regimens, this leads to high mortality rates. Due to the growing incidence rates, lack of treatments, and high mortality rate, intensive prevention of contamination is necessary.

One of the more significant risk factors for Elizabethkingia is whether mechanical ventilation was used with the patient.  Because it can form a biofilm in moist environments, water or water-related equipment can also aid in the transfer of Elizabethkinga in hospital environments.

In children 
Neonatal meningitis is the most common presentation of Elizabethkingia for children. Recent studies suggest that approximately 31% of children that have Elizabethkingia pass away from the infection, with an average life expectancy of 27 days from onset of symptoms. For the children who recover from Elizabethkingia, about 48% report typical development and full recovery. 30% indicated an onset of hydrocephalus post-recovery. Many other cases included various onsets post-recovery, including motor deficits, cognitive deficits, ongoing seizures, spasticity, and/or hearing loss.

References 

Bacteria described in 2005
Bacteria genera
Flavobacteria